Iaal Fortress, also known as Mustafa Barbar Agha Fortress, is a huge defensive castle located in Iaal in the Zgharta District of the North Governorate of Lebanon.

History
Built in 1816 by the Ottoman Governor of Tripoli Mustafa Agha Barbar, it sits on a high hill overlooking a wide panoramic view. Barbar was appointed Governor of Tripoli by the Ottomans in 1798. He built his castle here because of the strategic location and perhaps also because of the sense of calm and security it provided. Even today from this hilltop, visitors can look down on olive orchards, wild gardens and a clear view of Tripoli and the Mediterranean coast.

Visitors arrive at the castle by taking a wide set of grassy steps which bring them to a front entrance guarded by a huge wooden door covered with metal studs. Within the 5,000 square meters of the castle walls are stables, wells, sleeping quarters and reservoirs. The large court has a central basin called 'birket as-sbaa' (in Arabic) or 'basin of the lions', named for the lions carved on the stone. There are also small rooms around the courtyard which served as bathrooms and bedrooms in the old days. A narrow stone staircase leads to a serial, where Barbar had his office. Nearby were the women's rooms.

Unfortunately, the castle has lost most of its roof, except for the section where some of Barbar's modern descendants are now living. Behind the fortress a small graveyard holds the marble tombs of Barbar and his family. There is also a mosque and some old barracks in this part of the castle grounds.

Iaal Fortress can be reached by going through Zgharta and turning left towards the town of Khaldieh. Iaal village, with its population of about 1,000 people, is only 6 km from Zgharta.

See also
List of castles in Lebanon

References

External links
 Ehden Family Tree

Castles in Lebanon
Tourist attractions in Lebanon
Ottoman architecture in Lebanon
Buildings and structures of the Ottoman Empire
Ottoman fortifications
Government buildings completed in 1816
Infrastructure completed in 1816
Zgharta District
1816 establishments in the Ottoman Empire